Dvora "Debbie" Biton (born 25 June 1965) is an Israeli lawyer and politician who currently serves as a member of the Knesset for Yesh Atid.

Biography
Biton was born in Sderot on 25 June 1965. She has a master's degree in law and worked for a time as a lawyer.

Biton served as Yesh Atid's leader in Sderot beginning in 2013. In 2013 she ran for the mayorlty of Sderot, finishing in last place with 3.5% of the vote. She was placed thirty-seventh on the Yesh Atid for the 2015 Knesset elections, but failed to be elected. In the 2018 municipal elections she ran for Sderot's City Council at the head of a local party list, which received only 585 and failed to win a seat. She was forty-ninth on the joint Blue and White list for the April 2019 elections, but again missed out.

Prior to the 2022 Knesset elections Biton was placed twenty-first on the Yesh Atid list, and was elected to the Knesset as the party won 24 seats.

Personal life
Biton is married, has three children and resides in Sderot.

References

External links

1965 births
Living people
Israeli women lawyers
Yesh Atid politicians
Members of the 25th Knesset (2022–)
Women members of the Knesset
21st-century Israeli women politicians
21st-century Israeli lawyers
21st-century women lawyers
People from Sderot
Jewish Israeli politicians